Bangladesh–Fiji relations refer to the bilateral relations between Bangladesh and Fiji.  Fiji recognized Bangladesh on January 31, 1972. Diplomatic relations between the two countries were officially started in 2003. The two countries are common members of the Commonwealth of Nations. In 2013, the Foreign Minister of Bangladesh urged the Fijian government to steer the country towards democracy.

Agriculture
Bangladesh and Fiji are considering signing a memorandum of understanding on agricultural development through which Bangladesh will provide its agricultural technology to Fiji.

Cultural relations 
In 2014, Fiji signed a memorandum of understanding with the Bangladesh Rugby Union to help develop rugby in Bangladesh. The assistance is set to commence with the Fiji-Bangladesh Friendship Rugby tournament to be held in February 2015.

Economic relations 
Both Bangladesh and Fiji have shown deep interest in expanding the bilateral economic activities between the two countries. Because of the efficient business registration procedures in Fiji Bangladeshi investors have shown their interest to invest in Fiji. The textiles industries has been identified as a potential sector for Bangladeshi businessmen to invest in Fiji. Other potential sectors include medical, information and communication technology.

In 2007, the Bangladesh High Commissioner to Fiji met with Fiji's Health Minister to discuss bulk export of Bangladeshi pharmaceuticals.

In 2019, Bangladesh exported $2.61M to Fiji. The main products exported from Bangladesh to Fiji were apparel and knit, and pharmaceutical products. On the same year, Fiji exported $985k to Bangladesh. The main products exported from Fiji to Bangladesh were scrap iron. Pran also exports consumer items to Fiji and a number of other pacific Islands.

In the 2020-21 fiscal year, Bangladesh's exports to Fiji reached US$2.64million.

Bangladeshis in Fiji 
As of 2019, there were around 3,000 Bangladeshis living Fiji, mainly employed in the garments industry, hospitality and other service sectors. In addition, there were at least 17,000 Bengali-speaking people who arrived in Fiji between 1879 and 1916 during the colonial rule. In 2019 and 2021, some Bangladeshi expatriates complained about abuses in their work places and exploitation by their employers.

References 

 
Fiji
Bilateral relations of Fiji